Cristina Nevado (born 1977) is a Spanish chemist who is a Professor of Organic Chemistry at the University of Zurich. Her research considers chemical synthesis and organometallic reactions. She received the 2021 Margaret Faul Women in Chemistry Award.

Early life and education 
Nevado was born in Madrid and grew up in Spain. She was the first scientist in her family. At high school she was inspired by her chemistry and physics teachers to pursue a career in science. She eventually studied chemistry at the Autonomous University of Madrid, and earned her bachelor's degree in 2000. During one summer holiday she worked at the Menéndez Pelayo International University, where she met international students and realised the scientific community was global. She remained at the Autonomous University for her doctoral research, where she worked on organic chemistry and the cyclisation of enynes that had been catalysed by gold and platinum complexes. After earning her doctorate, Nevado moved to the Max Planck Institute for Coal Research, where she worked as a postdoctoral fellow with Alois Fürstner. Her postdoctoral research considered natural product synthesis. She spent three months working alongside Eiichi Nakamura at the University of Tokyo.

Research and career 
Nevado joined the University of Zurich as an Assistant Professor in 2007. Her research has concentrated on catalysis and the development of selective, sustainable approaches to develop new materials. In particular, Nevado is interested in new approaches to construct C–C and C–X bonds based on transition metal catalysts. In 2011 Nevado was awarded a Starting Grant from the European Research Council to develop catalysts based on nature. These gold(I) and gold(III)-catalytic tools look to promote the synthesis of biologically relevant small molecules with high levels of stereocontrol. She was promoted to Professor in 2013. Nevado develops computational tools to study biological processes in an effort to understand cancer metastasis and progression.

She serves on the editorial board of the ACS Central Science and the advisory board of the Reaxys Doctoral Prize.

Awards and honours 

 2008 Spanish Royal Society of Chemistry Young Investigator Award
 2011 Thieme Chemistry Journals Award
 2011 Chemical Society Review Emerging Investigator Award
 2013 Swiss Chemical Society Werner Prize
 2019 Royal Society of Chemistry Organometallic Chemistry 
2021 Margaret Faul Women in Chemistry Award

Selected publications

References 

Autonomous University of Madrid alumni
1977 births
Spanish women chemists
Organic chemists
Academic journal editors
Academic staff of the University of Zurich
Living people